Hudson County, New Jersey has historic districts which have been designated as such on a municipal, state, or federal level, or combination therof. Some are listed on New Jersey Register of Historic Places and are included on National Register of Historic Places listings in Hudson County, New Jersey. The following is intended to be a list of places which encompasses an area or group of buildings or structures.

Bergen Arches
Bergen Hill
Bergenline Avenue Commercial Historic District (32nd Street to 48th Street)
Clark Thread Company Historic District
Communipaw-Lafayette Historic District
Castle Point Terrace
Ellis Island
Buildings at 1200-1206 Washington Street
Gregory-Highpoint Historic District
Hackensack Water Company Complex
Hamilton Park Historic District
Harsimus Cove Historic District
Harsimus Stem Embankment
Hoboken Historic District
Holland Tunnel
Hudson and Manhattan Railroad Uptown Hudson Tubes and Downtown Hudson TubesNational Historic Civil Engineering Landmark 1978 by the American Society of Civil Engineers.

King's Bluff Historic District
Lincoln Tunnel: Lincoln Tunnel Approach and Helix, 
Lincoln Tunnel Toll Plaza and Ventilation Buildings
Lower Bergenline/Broadway Historic District
Monastery and Church of Saint Michael the Archangel
North River Tunnels
Jersey City Medical Center, now the Beacon
Morris Canal
North River Tunnels
Paulus Hook Historic District
Statue of Liberty National Monument, Ellis Island and Liberty Island
Shippen Street Double Hairpin at Hackensack Plank Road
Summit Avenue Commercial Historic District
Van Vorst Park Historic District
West Shore Railroad Tunnel (now Bergenline Avenue (HBLR station))

References

External links
 D'town JC historic districts

 
Neighborhoods in Hudson County, New Jersey